Jackson Center may refer to:
Jackson Center, Ohio
Jackson Center, Pennsylvania